The 1983 Union 76 Pacific Southwest Open was a men's tennis tournament played on outdoor hard courts at the Los Angeles Tennis Club in Los Angeles, California in the United States. The event was part of the 1983 Volvo Grand Prix circuit. It was the 57th edition of the Pacific Southwest tournament and was scheduled to be held from April 11 through April 17, 1983 but due to rain the final was postponed until Monday, April 18. Second-seeded Gene Mayer won the singles title and the corresponding $36,000 first-prize money.

Finals

Singles
 Gene Mayer defeated  Johan Kriek 7–6, 6–1
 It was Mayer's 2nd singles title of the year and the 14th and last of his career.

Doubles
 Peter Fleming /  John McEnroe defeated  Sandy Mayer /  Ferdi Taygan 6–1, 6–2

References

External links
 ITF tournament edition details

Los Angeles Open (tennis)
Union 76 Pacific Southwest Open
Union 76 Pacific Southwest Open
Union 76 Pacific Southwest Open
Union 76 Pacific Southwest Open